The inauguration of James A. Garfield as the 20th president of the United States was held on Friday, March 4, 1881, at the East Portico of the United States Capitol in Washington, D.C. This was the 24th inauguration and marked the commencement of the only four-year term of James A. Garfield as president and Chester A. Arthur as vice president. Garfield was assassinated  days into this term, and Arthur ascended to the presidency. Chief Justice Morrison Waite administered the presidential oath of office.

Inauguration 
Garfield left his home in Mentor, Ohio for Washington, D.C. on Monday, February 28, 1881.

In his address, Garfield denounced attempts to impede African-American suffrage, expressed his confidence in the gold standard, warned against the dangers of high rates of illiteracy, and admonished the practice of polygamy by members of the Church of Jesus Christ of Latter-day Saints. Garfield was recognized as an extremely competent public speaker, but faced difficulty when composing his inaugural address. Three days before his inauguration, he scrapped his speech and feverishly began work on a new one. Exhausted by several sleepless nights of writing, he delivered his rushed oration on March 4, but it failed to live up to the high expectations of many of those present.

Inaugural ball 
Garfield's inaugural ball was hosted the night of the inauguration in the Smithsonian Institution's Arts and Industries Building, completed earlier that year. The centerpiece of the celebration was a large "Statue of America" in the museum's rotunda, who held an electric light in her raised right hand. The music at the event was directed by conductor John Philip Sousa, and performed by the Germania Orchestra of Philadelphia and the U.S. Marine Band.

See also
Presidency of James A. Garfield
1880 United States presidential election

References

External links

 U.S. Presidential Inaugurations: James A. Garfield
Text of Garfield's Inaugural Address

United States presidential inaugurations
1881 in Washington, D.C.
1881 in American politics
Presidency of James A. Garfield
March 1881 events